Kurfalija is a village in the municipality of Karbinci, North Macedonia.

Demographics
As of the 2021 census, Kurfalija had 12 residents with the following ethnic composition:
Persons for whom data are taken from administrative sources 7
Turks 5

According to the 2002 census, the village had a total of 43 inhabitants. Ethnic groups in the village include:
Turks 38
Others 5

References

Villages in Karbinci Municipality
Turkish communities in North Macedonia